Borrowing Trouble is a 1937 American comedy film directed by Frank R. Strayer and starring Jed Prouty, Shirley Deane and Spring Byington. It is part of the Jones Family series of films and is also known by the alternative title of The Jones Family in Borrowing Trouble.

Plot
The Jones Family's drugstore is robbed, but they believe they know the culprit.

Partial cast
 Jed Prouty as John Jones  
 Shirley Deane as Bonnie Jones  
 Spring Byington as Mrs. John Jones  
 Russell Gleason as Herbert Thompson  
 Kenneth Howell as Jack Jones  
 George Ernest as Roger Jones  
 June Carlson as Lucy Jones  
 Florence Roberts as Granny Jones  
 Billy Mahan as Bobby Jones  
 Marvin Stephens as Tommy McGuire  
 Andrew Tombes as Uncle George  
 Howard C. Hickman as Judge Walters  
 Cy Kendall as Chief Kelly  
 Joe Downing as Charlie  
 George Walcott as Lester McGuire  
 Dick Wessel as Joe  
 Wade Boteler as Sgt. Callahan

References

Bibliography
 Bernard A. Drew. Motion Picture Series and Sequels: A Reference Guide. Routledge, 2013.

External links
 

1937 films
1937 comedy films
American comedy films
Films directed by Frank R. Strayer
20th Century Fox films
American black-and-white films
Films scored by Samuel Kaylin
1930s English-language films
1930s American films